Benjamin Bernard Lahey is an American psychologist and developmental epidemiologist. He is the Irving B. Harris Professor in the Departments of Health Studies and Psychiatry and Behavioral Neuroscience at the University of Chicago. He has conducted research on psychological problems in children, adolescents, and adults such as ADHD and antisocial behavior, and he was a member of a scientific panel that constructed the current definition of ADHD in the 1990s. He was one of the authors of the papers that first hypothesized a hierarchical organization of dimensions of psychological problems, with a general factor at the top of the hierarchy. He is a fellow of the American Psychological Association and the Association for Psychological Science. He is also a member of both the International Society for Research in Child and Adolescent Psychopathology and the Society of Clinical Child and Adolescent Psychology, as well as a former president of both organizations. Lahey has received the Distinguished Research Award from the Society of Clinical and Adolescent Psychology.

Work 
 Oxford University Press published his 2021 book, "Dimensions of psychological problems: Replacing diagnostic categories with a more science-based and less stigmatizing alternative." .

References

External links
Faculty page

Living people
University of Chicago faculty
Davidson College alumni
University of Tennessee alumni
Attention deficit hyperactivity disorder researchers
Fellows of the American Psychological Association
Fellows of the Association for Psychological Science
American epidemiologists
American psychiatrists
Year of birth missing (living people)
American child psychologists